Juhani Aaltonen (born December 12, 1935) is a Finnish jazz saxophonist and flautist.

Born in Kouvola, Finland, he studied at Sibelius Academy and Berklee College of Music. He began playing professionally at the end of the 1950s. He played in a sextet led by Heikki Rosendahl during that time, and then studied flute performance at the Sibelius Academy and in the U.S. at the Berklee College of Music. Moving back to Finland, he settled in Helsinki and began working both as a session musician and with fusion groups. Later in the 1960s he formed a duo with Edward Vesala, as well as in the group Eero Koivistoinen for four years. He played with Tasavallan Presidentti in their earlier days, including for their first, eponymous, album. He recorded with Thad Jones and Mel Lewis and with Heikki Sarmanto in the late 1960s and early 1970s, and his first album as a soloist, Etiquette, was released in 1974.

In 1975, he became a member of the New Music Orchestra, and worked with the Nordic All Stars, Arild Andersen, and Peter Brötzmann later in the 1970s. The 1980s saw him working with the UFO Big Band, Jan Garbarek, Charlie Mariano, and others. He was granted a 15-year state grant from Finland in the mid-1980s. In 1983 he rejoined Tasavallan Presidentti, and has recorded and toured with them since. He was featured in a profile on composer Graham Collier in the 1985 Channel 4 documentary 'Hoarded Dreams'   He led a touring quartet from 1990 to 1992 with Olli Ahvenlahti, Heikki Virtanen and Reino Laine. Aaltonen and Heikki Sarmanto released a duo recording, Rise, in 2001; in 2003 Aaltonen's trio album Mother Tongue won a Jazz-Emma in Finland. Aaltonen continues to teach at the annual Nilsiä Music Camp.

Discography 
Etiquette, 1974
Strings, 1976, with Henrik Otto Donner
Springbird, 1979
Prana. Live at Groovy, 1982
Déjà Vu, 2000, with Art Farmer, Heikki Sarmanto, Pekka Sarmanto, Jukka-Pekka Uotila and Tapio Aaltonen
Rise, 2001, with Heikki Sarmanto
Mother Tongue, 2003, with Ulf Krokfors with Tom Nekljudow
Strings Revisited, 2003, with Reggie Workman, Andrew Cyrille and the Avanti! Chamber Orchestra
Suhka, 2003, with Jone Takamäki, Tane Kannisto, Verneri Pohjola, Patrik Latvala, Seppo Kantonen, Jarmo Savolainen, Pekka Nylund, Antti Hytti, Ulf Krokfors, Tom Nekljudow, and Stefan Paavola
Reflections, 2004, with Reggie Workman and Andrew Cyrille
Wonders Never Cease, 2005, with Mikko Iivanainen and Klaus Suonsaari
Illusion of a Ballad, 2006, with Ulf Krokfors and Tom Nekljudow
The Sky is Ruby,2007, UMO Jazz Orchestra with Raoul Björkenheim and Iro Haarla
Conclusions, 2009, with Iro Haarla, Ulf Krokfors, and Reino Laine

As sideman
With Arild Andersen
Shimri (ECM, 1976)
Green Shading into Blue (ECM, 1978)
With Graham Collier
Hoarded Dreams (Cuneiform, 1983 [2007])
With Edward Vesala
Nan Madol (JAPO, 1974)
Satu (ECM, 1977)

See also
Finnish jazz musicians
Music of Finland

References

External links
Official website
Jazz Finland
[ Juhani Aaltonen] at AllMusic

Finnish jazz musicians
Jazz saxophonists
Jazz flautists
1935 births
Living people
People from Kouvola
Finnish jazz composers
Berklee College of Music alumni
Finnish flautists
21st-century saxophonists
Finnish expatriates in the United States
Sibelius Academy alumni
21st-century flautists